Cryptoparachtes fedotovi is a spider species found in Georgia and Azerbaijan.

See also 
 List of Dysderidae species

References

External links 

Dysderidae
Spiders of Asia
Fauna of Azerbaijan
Spiders of Georgia (country)
Spiders described in 1956